The following article presents a summary of the 2008-09 football (soccer) season in Guatemala.

National leagues

Liga Nacional

Apertura champion: Comunicaciones (22nd title).
Top scorer:  Adrián Apellaniz (10).
Clausura champion: Jalapa (2nd title).
Top scorer: Carlos González (10).
International qualifiers:
2009–10 CONCACAF Champions League: Comunicaciones, Jalapa.
Relegated: Petapa.
Source: RSSSF

Primera División de Ascenso
Apertura champion: San Pedro (1st title).
Clausura champion: Juventud Retalteca (1st title).
Promoted:  Universidad SC, Peñarol La Mesilla, Juventud Retalteca.
Relegated: La Gomera, Saranate, Amatitlán.
Source: RSSSF

National team
This section covers the Guatemala national team matches from the beginning of June 2008 until the end of June 2009.

The Guatemala national team played the entirety of its 2010 World Cup qualification campaign from June 2008 to November 2008, being eliminated in the Third Round of the CONCACAF region as third place in its group.

KEY:  F = Friendly match; WCQ2010 = 2010 FIFA World Cup qualification; UNCAF 2009 = UNCAF Nations Cup 2009

See also
Liga Nacional de Fútbol de Guatemala
Primera División de Ascenso
Liga Nacional de Guatemala 2008–09
Guatemala national football team

References

External links
 Guatemala National Football Federation 
 Guatefutbol